is a mountain located in the Daisetsuzan Volcanic Group of the Ishikari Mountains, Hokkaidō, Japan. The mountain sits on the southern rim of the Ohachi Daira caldera.

References
 Geographical Survey Institute

Hokkai